Holly Samos (born 23 December 1970 in Guildford, Surrey) is a radio broadcaster. A former member of Chris Evans's breakfast show team from the 1990s, she continued her career as the Formula 1 pit lane reporter for BBC Radio 5 Live for five years until 2011. She currently freelance broadcasts for BBC Radio Oxford, and works for Formula One.

Early life
Born to a Greek father and English mother in Surrey, Samos grew up in London and Northampton. A portable radio cassette player given to her for Christmas as a child led her onto the path of broadcasting. She gained 9 O-Levels and studied for a BTEC National Diploma in Business & Finance at Northampton College for Further Education, before studying in London at Ealing College for a Bachelor of Arts degree in Design and Media Management.

Her first job was a Saturday job as a teenager working on a market stall selling winter coats.

Early career
Aged 19 during her college years in London, Samos undertook work experience for GLR (BBC Greater London Radio) as a runner and switchboard operator, where she worked on the Greenhouse show presented by Chris Evans. She completed her degree, and moved into the record business working for MCA Records on Piccadilly in the A&R department.

Chris Evans period - BBC1 / Virgin Radio
In 1994, Chris Evans moved to the BBC to take over the Breakfast show from Steve Wright, taking previous colleagues, producer John Revell, sound engineer Dan McGrath and radio researcher Samos. The 7-month contract evolved in to seven years on the breakfast show until 2001.

In September 1997, Evans and his team made a return to Breakfast Radio, on Virgin Radio.

By the middle of the May 2001, Evans was reported to have sacked his team and the Chris Evans breakfast show was dissolved.

After Evans
When Samos left Virgin Radio she moved to the Century FM network/Century Digital presenting The Confessional and then the late night love show LoveLines. As a result of Jeremy Kyle taking over the late night weekly slot with Late Night Love, Samos was moved to an earlier evening slot in the weekends presenting '‘Hairbrush Divas'’ in late 2003.

Samos also undertook a lot of commercial work during her career, she presented for the Formula One Jordan team, the BBC's Holiday programme, and a number of fashion and beauty shows. She also works as a professional voice-over artist.

After Capital Radio took over Century Network, Samos moved to London's Heart 106.2 to present the Saturday breakfast show with Toby Anstis. She also returned to Virgin Radio as a swing shift DJ to cover radio shows from 2005 to present day.

In March 2006, it was announced by BBC Radio Five Live that Samos had joined their Formula One team, and reported the latest news live from the pit lane and the paddock at each grand prix for five years.

In January 2008 she became Virgin's presenter of Sunday Early Mornings 26am.

In 2010, she featured in the Codemasters game F1 2010, alongside David Croft (5 Live commentator). She has also been the voice behind the Renault F1 Official Podcast and Force India F1 Team Podcast.

She was not part of the BBC Radio Five Live commentary team for the 2011 Formula One season.

After leaving BBC Radio 5 Live in 2011 Samos has worked for Formula One Management, Fanvision, AllSport, F1.com, hosts events for Formula One, various sport, music fashion and beauty companies. From 2011 to 2020, Samos provided the official live voiceovers for the Brit Awards. She also freelance presents on BBC Radio Oxford.

References

External links

British radio personalities
British radio DJs
Virgin Radio (UK)
People from Guildford
1970 births
Living people
British people of Greek descent